Joseph Edward Gandy (August 24, 1847 – June 2, 1934) was an American politician in the state of Washington. He served as a Republican in the Washington House of Representatives.

References

Republican Party members of the Washington House of Representatives
1847 births
1934 deaths